Pembrokeshire Fish Week is an biannual food festival held in June and July that celebrates Pembrokeshire’s seafood, coastline, beaches, and maritime heritage. It has many events that take place across the county.

Events

During the festival there are over 250 events across the county with restaurants and pubs serving special menus, there are also cookery demonstrations, cookery classes, foraging events and educational activities.

Guided walks, sea fishing trips, fishing competitions, kayaking and surfing events also take place.

Economic impact

Pembrokeshire Fish Week is a social enterprise that is supported by Pembrokeshire County Council and the port of Milford Haven. In 2014 the event brought £2.7m to the county’s economy with 150 businesses taking part and an attendance estimated at 32,000 people. It is a key event in the county calendar and makes a significant contribution to the economy.

Awards and recognition

Pembrokeshire Fish Week has been named as Number 1 in the Top 10 Best Food Festivals by The Independent (2013). It has also been listed as one of the UK’s best food festivals by Conde Nast Traveller (2013) and Number 1 of the top 10 food festivals in the UK  by Visit Britain (2011).

Pembrokeshire Fish Week won the Gold Award in the Food Tourism Destination category in the True Taste Food and Drink Awards 2009/ 2010, and Pembrokeshire Tourism’s ‘Premier Event Award’ 2009 / 2010.

Videos

Pembrokeshire Fish Week video

See also 
Pembrokeshire 
Cuisine of Pembrokeshire.

References 

Food and drink festivals in the United Kingdom
Pembrokeshire
Annual events in Wales
2000 establishments in Wales
Recurring events established in 2000
Summer events in Wales